The theory of isometries in the framework of Banach spaces has its beginning in a paper by Stanisław Mazur and Stanisław M. Ulam in 1932. They proved the Mazur–Ulam theorem stating that every isometry of a normed real linear space onto a normed real linear space is a linear mapping up to translation. In 1970, Aleksandr Danilovich Aleksandrov asked whether the existence of a single conservative distance for a mapping implies that it is an isometry. Themistocles M. Rassias posed the following problem:

Aleksandrov–Rassias Problem.

There have been several attempts in the mathematical literature by a number of researchers for the solution to this problem.

References 

 P. M. Pardalos, P. G. Georgiev and H. M. Srivastava (eds.), Nonlinear Analysis. Stability, Approximation, and Inequalities. In honor of Themistocles M. Rassias on the occasion of his 60th birthday, Springer, New York, 2012.
 A. D. Aleksandrov,  Mapping  of families of sets, Soviet Math. Dokl. 11(1970), 116–120.
 On the Aleksandrov-Rassias problem for isometric mappings
 On the Aleksandrov-Rassias problem and the geometric invariance in Hilbert spaces
 S.-M. Jung and K.-S. Lee, An inequality for distances between 2n points and the Aleksandrov–Rassias problem, J. Math. Anal. Appl. 324(2)(2006), 1363–1369.
 S. Xiang, Mappings of conservative distances and the Mazur–Ulam theorem, J. Math. Anal. Appl. 254(1)(2001), 262–274.
 S. Xiang, On the Aleksandrov problem and Rassias problem for isometric mappings, Nonlinear Functional Analysis and Appls. 6(2001), 69-77.
 S. Xiang, On approximate isometries, in : Mathematics in the 21st Century (eds. K. K. Dewan and M. Mustafa), Deep Publs. Ltd., New Delhi, 2004, pp. 198–210.

Mathematical analysis
Metric geometry
Functional equations